Strontium hydroxide, Sr(OH)2, is a caustic alkali composed of one strontium ion and two hydroxide ions. It is synthesized by combining a strontium salt with a strong base. Sr(OH)2 exists in anhydrous, monohydrate, or octahydrate form.

Preparation
Because Sr(OH)2 is  slightly soluble in cold water, its preparation can be easily carried out by the addition of a strong base such as NaOH or KOH, drop by drop to a solution of any  soluble strontium salt, most commonly Sr(NO3)2 (strontium nitrate). The Sr(OH)2 will precipitate out as a fine white powder. From here, the solution is filtered, and the Sr(OH)2 is washed with cold water and dried.

Applications

Strontium hydroxide is used chiefly in the refining of beet sugar and as a stabilizer in plastic. It may be used as a source of strontium ions when the chlorine from strontium chloride is undesirable. Strontium hydroxide absorbs carbon dioxide from the air to form strontium carbonate.

Safety

Strontium hydroxide is a severe skin, eye and respiratory irritant. It is harmful if swallowed.

References

External links
http://www.chemicalland21.com/industrialchem/inorganic/STRONTIUM%20HYDROXIDE.htm

Strontium compounds
Hydroxides